The deputy prime minister of Australia is the deputy chief executive and the second highest ranking officer of the Australian Government. The office of deputy prime minister was officially created as a ministerial portfolio in 1968, although the title had been used informally for many years previously.  The deputy prime minister is appointed by the governor-general on the advice of the prime minister. When Australia has a Labor government (as it does now), the deputy leader of the parliamentary party holds the position of deputy prime minister. When Australia has a Coalition government, the Coalition Agreement mandates that all Coalition members support the leader of the Liberal Party becoming prime minister and mandates that the leader of the National Party be selected as deputy prime minister.

The 2017–18 Australian parliamentary eligibility crisis resulted in the position being made vacant for the first time since its official creation. Barnaby Joyce, the then-incumbent, was ruled ineligible to be a member of parliament by the High Court of Australia sitting as the Court of Disputed Returns on 27 October 2017, as he held New Zealand citizenship at the time of his election in contravention of Section 44 of the Constitution of Australia. Julie Bishop would act in the place of the prime minister during the vacancy in the deputy premiership. Joyce regained the position on 6 December 2017 after he won the by-election for the seat of New England several days earlier.

History

Originally the position of deputy Prime Minister was an unofficial or honorary position accorded to the second-highest ranking minister in the government. The unofficial position acquired more significance following the 1922 federal election, which saw the governing Nationalist Party lose its parliamentary majority.  The Nationalists eventually reached a coalition agreement with the Country Party, which called for Country Party leader Earle Page to take the second rank in the Nationalist-led ministry of Stanley Bruce.  While Page's only official title was Treasurer, he was considered as a deputy to Bruce.

From then until 1968, the Coalition agreement between the Liberals (and their predecessors) and Country Party called for the leader of the Country Party (subsequently the National Party) to rank second in Cabinet. That continues to be case when the Coalition is in government. In the case of Labor governments, the party's deputy leader ranks second in Cabinet.

On 19 December 1967, John McEwen, the long-serving leader of the Country Party in the Coalition government, was sworn in as interim Prime Minister following the sudden death in office of Prime Minister Harold Holt. (There was discussion that deputy Liberal leader and Treasurer William McMahon should assume the office.  McMahon had planned a party room meeting on 20 December to elect a new leader, intending to stand for the position himself. However, this was pre-empted by McEwen who publicly declared on the morning of 18 December that he would not serve in a McMahon government.) McEwen was sworn in as prime minister on the understanding that his commission would continue only so long as it took for the Liberals to elect a new leader. Governor-General Lord Casey also accepted the view put to him by McEwen that to commission a Liberal temporarily as Prime Minister would give that person an unfair advantage in the forthcoming party room ballot for the permanent leader. McEwen's appointment was in keeping with the previous occasion when the main non-Labor party was without a leader; Earle Page of the Country Party was interim prime minister between 7 and 26 April 1939—the period between Joseph Lyons' sudden death and the United Australia Party naming Robert Menzies his successor.

The Liberal leadership ballot was rescheduled for 9 January 1968. As it turned out, McMahon did not stand, and Senator John Gorton was elected, replacing McEwen as prime minister on 10 January 1968. McEwen reverted to his previous status as the second-ranking member of the government, as per the Coalition agreement.  He had unofficially been deputy prime minister since becoming Country Party leader in 1958, and since 1966 had exercised an effective veto over government policy by virtue of being the longest-serving member of the government; he had been a member of the Coalition frontbench without interruption since 1937. To acknowledge McEwen's long service and his status as the second-ranking member of the government, Gorton formally created the post of Deputy Prime Minister, with McEwen as the first holder of the post.

According to parliamentary records, in the time before the position of deputy prime minister was officially created, the position was known as "deputy leader of the Government."

Since 1968 only three deputy prime ministers have gone on to become prime minister: Paul Keating, Julia Gillard, and Anthony Albanese. Both Keating and Gillard succeeded incumbent prime ministers who lost the support of their party caucus mid-term. Meanwhile, Albanese who briefly served as deputy prime minister in 2013, later led the Labor party to victory at the 2022 Australian federal election, and was sworn-in as prime minister on 23 May 2022. Frank Forde, who had been deputy Labor leader when John Curtin died, was interim prime minister between 6 and 13 July 1945, when a leadership ballot took place that elected Ben Chifley as Curtin's successor.

In November 2007, when the Australian Labor Party won government, Julia Gillard became Australia's first female, and first foreign-born, deputy prime minister.

In 2017, the position became vacant for a period of 40 days, the only time in its history when it has been unoccupied.  As part of the 2017–18 Australian parliamentary eligibility crisis, it emerged that the then-incumbent Barnaby Joyce was a citizen of New Zealand by descent (jus sanguinis – by right of blood) at the time of the 2016 federal election.  Joyce told the House of Representatives that he was advised of his citizenship status on 10 August 2017 by the New Zealand High Commission and his renunciation of his dual citizenship became effective on 15 August 2017. Nevertheless, he asked for his case to be referred to the High Court of Australia (sitting as the Court of Disputed Returns) for adjudication, and they ruled that his election was invalid under section 44 of the Constitution of Australia.  The government immediately issued writs for a by-election for the seat of New England to be held on 2 December 2017, which Joyce won easily.  Governor-General Sir Peter Cosgrove re-appointed Joyce as deputy prime minister on 6 December 2017.

In practice, only National party leaders or Labor Party deputy leaders have held the position.

Duties
The Deputy Prime Minister has always been a member of the Cabinet, and has always held at least one substantive portfolio. It would be technically possible for a minister to hold only the portfolio of Deputy Prime Minister, but this has never happened.

Succession 

The Deputy Prime Minister becomes Acting Prime Minister if the Prime Minister is unable to undertake their role for a short time, for example if they are ill, overseas or on leave (and if both are unavailable, then another senior minister takes on this role). If the Prime Minister were to die, then the Deputy Prime Minister would be appointed Prime Minister by the Governor-General, until the government votes for another member to be its leader.

Salary
Members of parliament receive a base salary of $203,030, which is set by the Remuneration Tribunal (an independent statutory authority). Ministers receive an additional amount, which is determined by the government itself based on the recommendations of the Remuneration Tribunal. The deputy prime minister receives an additional 105 percent of the base salary, making for a total salary of $416,212. The holder of the office also receives various other allowances and entitlements.

List of deputy prime ministers of Australia
The following individuals have been officially appointed as deputy prime minister of Australia since the office of deputy prime minister was created as a ministerial portfolio in 1968:

References

External links
The official site of the Deputy Prime Minister of Australia

 
Lists of government ministers of Australia
Prime Minister of Australia